In complex geometry, a Hopf surface is a compact complex surface obtained as a quotient of the complex vector space (with zero deleted)  by a free action of a discrete group. If this group is the integers the Hopf surface is called primary, otherwise it is called secondary. (Some authors use the term "Hopf surface" to mean "primary Hopf surface".)

Higher-dimensional analogues of Hopf surfaces are called Hopf manifolds.

Invariants
Hopf surfaces are surfaces of class VII and in particular all have Kodaira dimension , and all their plurigenera vanish. The geometric genus is 0. The fundamental group has a normal central infinite cyclic subgroup of finite index. The Hodge diamond is

In particular the first Betti number is 1 and  the second Betti number is 0. 
Conversely  showed that  a compact complex surface with vanishing the second Betti number and whose  fundamental group contains an infinite cyclic subgroup of finite index is a Hopf surface.

Primary Hopf surfaces

In the course of classification of compact complex surfaces, Kodaira classified the primary Hopf surfaces.

A primary Hopf surface is obtained as 
 
where  is a group generated by
a polynomial contraction .
In appropriate coordinates,   
can be written as

where  are complex numbers
satisfying , and either

These surfaces contain an elliptic curve (the image of the x-axis) and if  the image of the y-axis is a second elliptic curve. When , the Hopf surface is an elliptic fiber space over the projective line if 

The Picard group of any primary Hopf surface is isomorphic to the non-zero complex numbers .

 has proven that a complex surface 
is diffeomorphic to  if and only if it is a primary Hopf surface.

Secondary Hopf surfaces
Any secondary Hopf surface has a finite unramified cover that is a primary Hopf surface. Equivalently, its fundamental group has a subgroup of finite index in its center that is isomorphic to the integers.  classified  them by finding the finite groups acting without fixed points on primary Hopf surfaces.

Many examples of secondary Hopf surfaces can be constructed with underlying space  a product of a spherical space forms and a circle.

References 

 

Complex surfaces